Bernisdale is a small township, near the head of Loch Snizort Beag, Isle of Skye in the Highlands and Islands and is in the Scottish council area of Highland.

References

Populated places in the Isle of Skye